Starominsky (masculine), Starominskaya (feminine), or Starominskoye (neuter) may refer to:
Starominsky District, a district of Krasnodar Krai, Russia
Starominskaya, a rural locality (a stanitsa) in Starominsky District of Krasnodar Krai, Russia